Benjamin Sharpsteen (November 4, 1895 – December 20, 1980) was an American film director and producer for Disney. He directed 31 films between 1920 and 1980. Sharpsteen created a museum documenting the history of California's first millionaire, Sam Brannan, and the history of the Upper Napa Valley as well as more on Sharpsteen's life and work at the Sharpsteen Museum located in Calistoga, California. He died in Sonoma County, California.

Filmography

References

External links

1895 births
1980 deaths
American film producers
American animated film producers
Businesspeople from Tacoma, Washington
Directors of Best Documentary Feature Academy Award winners
Directors of Best Documentary Short Subject Academy Award winners
Directors of Palme d'Or winners
Fantasy film directors
Film directors from Washington (state)
Film directors from California
People from Calistoga, California
Walt Disney Animation Studios people